This is a list of prominent people from Vanuatu.

Politics and diplomacy
John Bani (b. 1941), Anglican priest, President (1999-2004)
Moana Carcasses Kalosil (b. 1963), Prime Minister (2013-2014)
Maxime Carlot Korman (b. 1942), veteran politician, twice Prime Minister in the 1990s
Harry Iauko (d.2012), MP for Tanna, several times minister
Willie Jimmy, several times minister, ambassador to China
Donald Kalpokas (b. 1943), twice Prime Minister, then Permanent Representative to the United Nations
Ephraim Kalsakau, trade unionist and politician
Pakoa Kaltonga, MP for Efate, several times minister
Frederick Karlomuana Timakata (1937-1995), President (1989-1994)
Sato Kilman (b. 1957), Prime Minister (2011-2013)
Ham Lini (b. 1951), Prime Minister (2004-2008)
Hilda Lini, politician, anti-nuclear campaigner, feminist
Walter Lini (1942-1999), Anglican priest, anti-colonial leader, first Prime Minister (1979-1991)
Willie Bongmatur Maldo (1939-2009), president of the National Council of Chiefs (1977-1993)
Alfred Maseng (d.2004), President-elect in 2004 (election annulled)
Kalkot Mataskelekele (b. 1949), Supreme Court justice, then President of Vanuatu (2004-2009)
Grace Mera Molisa (1946-2002), poet, feminist, politician, signatory of the Constitution in 1979
Sela Molisa, MP for Santo, several times minister
Edward Natapei, twice Prime Minister in the 2000s
Joe Natuman, several times minister
Ralph Regenvanu (b. 1970), anthropologist, artist, politician, current Minister for Lands (2013-)
Sethy Regenvanu (b. 1945), churchman, several times government minister
Barak Sopé (b. 1955), Prime Minister 1999-2001
Paul Telukluk, several times minister
Robert Van Lierop, Permanent Representative to the United Nations in the 1980s
Serge Vohor (b. 1955), four times Prime Minister in the 1990s and 2000s
James Wango, MP for Ambae, Minister for Agriculture (2011)
George Wells, several times minister

Arts and literature
Grace Mera Molisa (1946-2002), poet, feminist, politician, signatory of the Constitution in 1979
Vanessa Quai (b. 1988), singer
Ralph Regenvanu (b. 1970), anthropologist, artist, politician

Other
Dalsie Baniala, IT regulator
Dinh Van Than, prominent businessman
Vincent Lunabek, current Chief Justice
Roy Mata, 13th century chief whose grave is a UNESCO World Heritage Site
Jimmy Stevens (d.1994), leader of the secessionist Nagriamel movement in the late 1970s

Vanuatu
 
Vanuatuans
Vanuatu
Vanuatu